
The Metz 1944 Cuff Title, or Metz 1944 Cuff Band, was a World War II German military decoration instituted to reward members of the Wehrmacht who took part in the 1944 battle of Metz.

Eligibility 
After the allied breakout from Normandy, the U.S. Third Army's advance towards Germany met with heavy resistance at Metz from a hastily assembled Battle Group Siegroth, consisting of miscellaneous Waffen-SS and Army units, with staff and students from the Metz officer cadet school. This resistance helped delay the allied advance towards Germany.

The cuff title was established on 24 October 1944 by Adolf Hitler. Eligibility was open to all members of Battle Group Siegroth, including soldiers and officials, who had taken part in the fighting at Metz from 27 August to 25 September 1944 for at least seven days, or a lesser time if wounded. Although the fighting around Metz continued until December 1944, service after 25 September did not qualify. This later fighting was after the involvement of Battle Group Siegroth, which had borne the brunt of the initial fighting that successfully repulsed the US Army.

The cuff title was also intended as a tradition badge (Traditionsabzeichen) to be worn by all future staff and officer cadets of the Metz Cadet School, (Fahnenjunkerschule VI), all the time they were serving there. The school closed before this was implemented.

Design and wear
The cuff title was a 32mm wide black fabric band, silver-edged, with the embroidered inscription Metz 1944 in silver braid, similar in style to Waffen-SS divisional and regimental cuff titles. 

It was worn on the lower left sleeve of the uniform, including by members of Nazi party organisations. Where two or more campaign cuff titles were awarded, the earliest qualified for was correctly worn above later awards, although this regulation was not always followed. 

There is evidence that a number were presented prior to the end of the war, although they were not widely distributed. 

Nazi era decorations were banned after the war. The Metz Cuff Title was among those re-authorised for wear by the Federal Republic of Germany in 1957. While many awards were re-designed to remove the swastika, the original cuff title could be worn unaltered as it did not bear this symbol. Members of the Bundeswehr who were qualifying veterans wore the award on their ribbon bar, represented by a small replica of the cuff design on a black ribbon with a silver stripe close to each edge.

References

Sources 

Website: Wehrmacht-awards.com: Metz 1944

See also 
 Orders, decorations, and medals of Nazi Germany
 Crete Cuff Title
 Africa Cuff Title
 Courland Cuff Title

Military awards and decorations of Nazi Germany
Awards established in 1944
1944 establishments in Germany